Wrath of Man is a 2021 heist action thriller film directed by Guy Ritchie, from a script he co-wrote with Ivan Atkinson and Marn Davies, and is loosely based on 2004 French film Cash Truck written by Nicolas Boukhrief and Éric Besnard, and directed by Boukhrief. It is Ritchie's fourth directorial collaboration with lead actor Jason Statham, and first since Revolver (2005). Statham stars as H, a new cash truck driver in Los Angeles whose thwarting of a robbery leads to his skillset with guns and mysterious past being questioned. Holt McCallany, Jeffrey Donovan, Chris Reilly, Josh Hartnett, Laz Alonso, Raúl Castillo, DeObia Oparei, Eddie Marsan and Scott Eastwood also star.

Wrath of Man was released in several countries on April 22, 2021, and in the United States on May 7. The film has grossed $104 million worldwide and received mixed reviews from critics upon release, who praised the action sequences but criticized the plot.

Plot 
In Los Angeles, an armored truck robbery leaves two guards and a bystander dead. This sets off a series of events told in four acts.

A Dark Spirit

Five months after the robbery, Patrick Hill joins Fortico Security as an armored truck guard. His manager Terry commends his references and company trainer "Bullet" nicknames him "H". Hill barely passes firearm training and gets off to a rocky start with his colleagues, including “Boy Sweat” Dave and Dana Curtis. During a pickup, Bullet is taken hostage, and Hill convinces a panicked Dave to comply with the robbers before he disposes of the entire crew with expert marksmanship and merciless efficiency. 

Hill is questioned by FBI agents investigating the first robbery. The FBI investigators bring their suspicions about Hill to their superior, Agent King, who tells them to leave Hill alone. Hill receives a dossier of Fortico employee files and an autopsy report. Three months later, Hill and Bullet are waylaid in Chinatown, but the robbers flee at the sight of Hill. Hill continues to investigate his coworkers and they become increasingly suspicious of him.

Scorched Earth

Five months before joining Fortico, on the day of the first robbery, Hill is with his son Dougie. Revealed to be working with a robbery crew, Hill grudgingly agrees to monitor an armored truck's route, leaving Dougie in the car. A group of robbers hijack the truck and spot Dougie. Hill races back to his son and watches as Dougie is executed before he is also shot and left for dead. 

Three weeks later, Hill wakes up in the hospital. He meets with King, who gives him a list of suspects and agrees to temporarily turn a blind eye. Hill is revealed to be Mason Hargreaves, a notorious crime lord; determined to find Dougie's killer, Hargreaves and his men — led by Mike, Brendan, and Moggy — kill nearly everyone on King's list, without results. Mike voices his concerns about retaliation, and Hargreaves agrees to lay low in London, but instead assumes the identity of Patrick Hill and joins Fortico to continue the hunt alone. It was Hargreaves' own crew who attempted the Chinatown robbery until Mike recognized him.

Bad Animals, Bad

Sometime before the first robbery, a group of disgruntled Afghanistan veterans — Carlos, Sam, Brad, Tom, Jan, and their former sergeant, Jackson — decide to become thieves. Their first robbery results in only a few hundred thousand dollars, so with help from an unidentified guard who served under Jackson, they pull off a more ambitious heist of an armored truck. Later, Hargreaves and his men help them arrange the Fortico heist; unaware of Hargreaves' identity, Jan needlessly shoots the guards, Dougie, and Hargreaves, who sees Jan's face.

Liver, Lungs, Spleen & Heart

Five months later, the veterans reunite to steal over $150 million from the Fortico depot on Black Friday weekend. Bullet reveals to Hargreaves that he is Jackson's inside man, threatening him into cooperating. The crew takes the depot hostage, but an alarm is triggered; in the ensuing gunfight, multiple guards are killed and Hargreaves kills and wounds several robbers. Fleeing with Bullet and Jackson, Jan murders them to escape alone with the money. At home, Jan finds a phone in one of the money bags, planted by Hargreaves to track its location. Hargreaves confronts him with Dougie's autopsy report, shooting him in the same places he shot Dougie. Abandoning the money, Hargreaves tells King his task is done and is driven away.

Cast

Production

Development 
It was announced in October 2019 that Guy Ritchie was writing and directing an English-language remake of the 2004 film Cash Truck, with Jason Statham set to star. Holt McCallany joined later in the month. Filming began in November between Los Angeles and London, with Scott Eastwood, Jeffrey Donovan, Laz Alonso, Josh Hartnett and Niamh Algar added to the cast, and Metro-Goldwyn-Mayer taking on U.S. domestic distribution for the film. In January 2020, Raúl Castillo was added to the cast.

Christopher Benstead, who previously worked with the director on The Gentlemen, composed the film score. Sony Classical released the soundtrack on May 7, 2021, coinciding with the film's release.

Release 
The film was released internationally in several countries, beginning on April 22, 2021, including Russia and Australia. It was later released in the United States on May 7, 2021. The film was originally set for release in the United States on January 15, but was delayed due to the COVID-19 pandemic. It was later rescheduled for April 23, before being delayed two weeks later. The film was released in China on May 10. In the United Kingdom, the film was originally going to be released by the British arm of Lionsgate. However, the film was ultimately released straight to streaming as an Amazon Original on Prime Video on 10 December 2021.

The film was released on Blu-ray and DVD on July 13, 2021, by Warner Bros. Home Entertainment/Studio Distribution Services and MGM Home Entertainment, and was later released on Ultra HD Blu-ray on January 17, 2023 by Shout! Factory. The film was added to Paramount+ on March 23, 2022.

Reception

Box office 
Wrath of Man grossed $27.5 million in the United States and Canada, and $76.5 million in other territories, for a worldwide total of $104 million. In the U.S., the film was released alongside Here Today and made $3 million from 2,875 theaters on its first day of release, including $500,000 from Thursday night previews. It went on to debut to $8.1 million, topping the box office. 

Men made up 60% of the overall audience, with 72% being over the age of 25. In its second weekend the film dropped 55% to $3.7 million, finishing second behind newcomer Spiral. In the film's opening weekend in Australia, it has grossed $1.34 million. It also made $201,000 in New Zealand and $3.79 million in Russia. In its third weekend of international release the film made $13.5 million, as well as $18.5 million in its Chinese opening weekend.

Critical response 
On the review aggregator website Rotten Tomatoes, 67% of 256 reviews are positive, with an average rating of 6.2/10. The site's critics consensus reads, "Wrestling just enough stakes out of its thin plot, Wrath of Man sees Guy Ritchie and Jason Statham reunite for a fun, action-packed ride." According to Metacritic, which assigned a weighted average score of 57 out of 100 based on 38 critics, the film received "mixed or average reviews". Audiences polled by CinemaScore gave the film an average grade of "A−" on an A+ to F scale, while PostTrak reported 77% of audience members gave it a positive score, with 57% saying they would definitely recommend it.

Alonso Duralde of the TheWrap wrote: "Ritchie's reunion with leading man Jason Statham delivers the scheming, the shooting, and the swearing that the director's fans have come to expect, by the bucketload." Mae Abdulbaki of Screen Rant gave the film a 3.5 out of 5 stars rating, stating that "the film balances multiple storylines with intense action sequences and, despite pacing issues, packs a major punch that will keep audiences riveted."

Writing for Variety, Peter Debruge said: "A few years ago, when Sam Mendes left the Bond franchise, Ritchie's name was floated as a possible replacement. He didn't take the gig, but Wrath of Man shows that he certainly could have, classing up his signature technique while never quite abandoning the cockney swagger." Richard Roeper of the Chicago Sun-Times gave the film 2 out of 4 stars, writing: "Tired, uninspired and meandering, Wrath of Man is a step backward for Ritchie, a step sideways for the stoic-for-life Jason Statham (reteaming with Ritchie for the first time in 16 years) and a misstep for anyone who invests their time and money on 118 minutes of such convoluted and forgettable nonsense."

Matt Zoller Seitz of RogerEbert.com was enthusiastic, rating it four stars out of four (the highest grade on the site), with him calling it  "one of [Guy] Ritchie's best-directed movies — and one of his most surprising, at least in terms of style and tone. Gone is the jumpy, busy, lighthearted, buzzed-bloke-in-a-pub-telling-you-a-tale vibe of film like Snatch, RocknRolla, The Man from U.N.C.L.E., King Arthur: Legend of the Sword, and the like. In its place is voluptuous darkness, so sinister that you may wonder if its main character is the devil himself... This is less of a self-consciously clever [Quentin] Tarantino-[Guy] Ritchie maneuver, and more in the poker-faced, un-ironic spirit of classic older films that inspired them, like The Killing and The Killers and Criss Cross," while describing the presentation of Statham's character as similar to those in Clint Eastwood's Western films High Plains Drifter and Pale Rider.

References

External links 
 

2021 films
2021 action thriller films
2021 crime thriller films
2021 crime action films
2020s heist films
American action thriller films
American crime thriller films
American crime action films
American heist films
American remakes of French films
American films about revenge
British action thriller films
British crime thriller films
British crime action films
British heist films
British remakes of French films
British films about revenge
Films about trucks
Films directed by Guy Ritchie
Films set in Los Angeles
Films shot in London
Films shot in Los Angeles
Miramax films
Metro-Goldwyn-Mayer films
Films postponed due to the COVID-19 pandemic
Films produced by Bill Block
2020s English-language films
2020s American films
2020s British films